Skibo may refer to:

 Skibo Castle
 Skibo, Minnesota
 Skibo Productions, 1930s film production house at the 8th Academy Awards, 10th Academy Awards